Richard Alexander Fain (born February 29, 1968) is an American former professional football player who was a cornerback in the National Football League (NFL) for two seasons during the early 1990s.  Fain played college football for the Florida Gators, and thereafter, he played professionally for the Cincinnati Bengals, Phoenix Cardinals and Chicago Bears of the NFL.

Early years 

Fain was born in Fort Myers, Florida.  He attended North Fort Myers High School in North Fort Myers, and was a standout high school football player for the North Fort Myers Red Knights.

College career 

Fain Accepted an athletic scholarship to attend the University of Florida in Gainesville, Florida, where he played for coach Galen Hall and coach Steve Spurrier's Gators teams from 1987 to 1990.  He had ten interceptions in four seasons, and received first-team All-Southeastern Conference (SEC) honors in 1989 and 1990, and was also a second-team All-American in 1989 and 1990.  Memorably, in 1990, he recovered a punt blocked by Jimmy Spencer, and returned it twenty-five yards for a touchdown—the margin of victory in the Gators' 17–13 victory over the Alabama Crimson Tide.

Fain graduated from the University of Florida with a bachelor's degree in exercise and sport sciences in 1990.

Professional career 

The Cincinnati Bengals selected Fain in the sixth round (157th pick overall) of the 1991 NFL Draft, and he played for the Bengals and Phoenix Cardinals during the  season. In Fain's two-season NFL career, he played in twenty-four regular season games and started eight of them.

See also 

 Florida Gators football, 1980–89
 Florida Gators football, 1990–99
 List of Chicago Bears players
 List of Florida Gators in the NFL Draft
 List of University of Florida alumni

References

Bibliography 

 Carlson, Norm, University of Florida Football Vault: The History of the Florida Gators, Whitman Publishing, LLC, Atlanta, Georgia (2007).  .
 Golenbock, Peter, Go Gators!  An Oral History of Florida's Pursuit of Gridiron Glory, Legends Publishing, LLC, St. Petersburg, Florida (2002).  .
 Hairston, Jack, Tales from the Gator Swamp: A Collection of the Greatest Gator Stories Ever Told, Sports Publishing, LLC, Champaign, Illinois (2002).  .
 McCarthy, Kevin M.,  Fightin' Gators: A History of University of Florida Football, Arcadia Publishing, Mount Pleasant, South Carolina (2000).  .
 Nash, Noel, ed., The Gainesville Sun Presents The Greatest Moments in Florida Gators Football, Sports Publishing, Inc., Champaign, Illinois (1998).  .

1968 births
Living people
People from North Fort Myers, Florida
Sportspeople from Fort Myers, Florida
Players of American football from Florida
American football cornerbacks
Florida Gators football players
Cincinnati Bengals players
Phoenix Cardinals players
Chicago Bears players